The General James Mitchell Varnum House is an historic house at 57 Peirce Street in East Greenwich, Rhode Island.  The -story wood-frame house was built in 1773 for James Mitchell Varnum, who later served as a general in the Continental Army during the American Revolutionary War.  It is five bays wide, with two interior brick chimneys.  Its main entry is sheltered by a portico supported by fluted Ionic columns and pilasters.  A 19th-century addition extends from the rear of the main block.  Notable later residents of the house include George A. Brayton, who served as Chief Justice of the Rhode Island Supreme Court.  The house was purchased in 1939 by the Varnum Continentals, and has since served as a museum.

The house was listed on the National Register of Historic Places in 1971.

See also
National Register of Historic Places listings in Kent County, Rhode Island

References

External links

Varnum House Museum

Images

Houses completed in 1773
Houses on the National Register of Historic Places in Rhode Island
Historic house museums in Rhode Island
Museums in Kent County, Rhode Island
Buildings and structures in East Greenwich, Rhode Island
Historic American Buildings Survey in Rhode Island
Houses in Kent County, Rhode Island
National Register of Historic Places in Kent County, Rhode Island
Historic district contributing properties in Rhode Island